, also known as ANA (Ē-enu-ē) or  is an airline in Japan. Its headquarters are located in Shiodome City Center in the Shiodome area of Minato ward of Tokyo. It operates services to both domestic and international destinations and had more than 20,000 employees as of March 2016.

In addition to its mainline operations, ANA controls several subsidiary passenger carriers, including its regional airline, ANA Wings, Air Nippon, Air Do (a low-cost carrier operating scheduled service between Tokyo and cities in Hokkaido), and Allex Cargo (ANA Cargo - the freighter division operated by Air Japan). ANA is also the largest shareholder in Peach, a low-cost carrier joint venture with Hong Kong company First Eastern Investment Group. In October 1999, the airline became a member of Star Alliance. On 29 March 2013, ANA was named a 5-Star Airline by Skytrax. On 27 April 2018, ANA announced ANA Business Jet Co., Ltd., a joint venture with Sojitz to offer private jet charter flights.

History

Formation 

Nippon Helicopter was the source of what would later be ANA's International Air Transport Association (IATA) airline code, NH.

NH began helicopter services in February 1953. On 15 December 1953, it operated its first cargo flight between Osaka and Tokyo using a de Havilland Dove, JA5008. This was the first scheduled flight flown by a Japanese pilot in postwar Japan. Passenger service on the same route began on 1 February 1954, and was upgraded to a de Havilland Heron in March. In 1955, Douglas DC-3s began flying for NH as well, by which time the airline's route network extended from northern Kyūshū to Sapporo. In December 1957 Nippon Helicopter changed its name to All Nippon Airways Company.

Although it was founded on 26 December 1952, one day before Nippon Helicopter, it did not begin operations until 20 January 1954, when it began night cargo runs between Osaka and Tokyo, also using a de Havilland Dove. It adopted the DC-3 in early 1957, by which point its route network extended through southern Japan from Tokyo to Kagoshima.

Far East Airlines merged with the newly named All Nippon Airways in March 1958. The combined companies had a total market capitalization of 600 million yen, and the result of the merger was Japan's largest private airline. The merged airline received a new Japanese name (Japan Air Transport). The company logo of the larger NH was selected as the logo of the new combined airline, and the new carrier operated a route network combined from its two predecessors.

Domestic era 

ANA grew through the 1960s, adding the Vickers Viscount to the fleet in 1960 and the Fokker F27 in 1961. October 1961 marked ANA's debut on the Tokyo Stock Exchange as well as the Osaka Securities Exchange.  1963 saw another merger, with Fujita Airlines, raising the company's capital to 4.65 billion yen. In 1965 ANA introduced jets with Boeing 727s on the Tokyo-Sapporo route. It also introduced Japan's first homegrown turboprop airliner, the NAMC YS-11 in 1965, replacing Convair 440s on local routes. In 1969, ANA introduced Boeing 737 services.

As ANA grew it started to contract travel companies across Japan to handle ground services in each region.  Many of these companies received shares in ANA as part of their deals. Some of these relationships continue today in different forms: for instance, Nagoya Railroad, which handled ANA's operations in the Chūbu region along with other partnerships, maintains a permanent seat on ANA's board of directors. By 1974, ANA had Japan's largest domestic airline network.

While ANA's domestic operations grew, the Ministry of Transport had granted government-owned Japan Airlines (JAL) a monopoly on international scheduled flights that lasted until 1986. ANA was allowed to operate international charter flights: its first was a Boeing 727 charter from Tokyo to Hong Kong on 21 February 1971.

ANA bought its first widebody aircraft, six Lockheed L-1011s, in November 1971, following a lengthy sales effort by Lockheed which had involved negotiations between US president Richard Nixon, Japanese prime minister Kakuei Tanaka and UK prime minister Edward Heath (lobbying in favor of engine maker Rolls-Royce). Tanaka also pressed Japanese regulators to permit ANA to operate on Asia routes as part of the package. The aircraft entered service on the Tokyo-Okinawa route in 1974. The carrier had ordered McDonnell Douglas DC-10s but cancelled the order at the last minute and switched to Lockheed. It was later revealed that Lockheed had indirectly bribed Prime Minister Kakuei Tanaka to force this switch: the scandal led to the arrest of Tanaka and several managers from ANA and Lockheed sales agent Marubeni for corruption.

Boeing 747-200s were introduced on the Tokyo-Sapporo and Tokyo-Fukuoka routes in 1976 and Boeing 767s in 1983 on Shikoku routes. The carrier's first B747s were the short-range SR variant, designed for Japanese domestic routes.

International era 

In 1986, ANA began to expand beyond Japan's key domestic carrier to become a competitive international carrier as well. On 3 March 1986, ANA started scheduled international flights with a passenger service from Tokyo to Guam. Flights to Los Angeles and Washington, D.C., followed by year's end, and ANA also entered a service agreement with American Airlines to feed the US carrier's new flights to Narita.

ANA expanded its international services gradually: to Beijing, Dalian, Hong Kong and Sydney in 1987; to Seoul in 1988; to London and Saipan in 1989; to Paris in 1990 and to New York and Singapore in 1991. Airbus equipment such as the A320 and A321 was added to the fleet in the early 1990s, as was the Boeing 747-400 jet. ANA joined the Star Alliance in October 1999.

2004 saw ANA's profits exceed JAL's for the first time. That year, facing a surplus of slots due to the construction of new airports and the ongoing expansion of Tokyo International Airport, ANA announced a fleet renewal plan that would replace some of its large aircraft with a greater number of smaller aircraft.

Also in 2004, ANA set up low-cost subsidiary Air Next to operate flights from Fukuoka Airport starting in 2005, and became the majority shareholder in Nakanihon Airline Service (NAL) headquartered in Nagoya Airport. In 2005, ANA renamed NAL to Air Central, and relocated its headquarters to Chūbu Centrair International Airport. On 12 July 2005, ANA reached a deal with NYK to sell its 27.6% share in Nippon Cargo Airlines, a joint venture formed between the two companies in 1987. The sale allowed ANA to focus on developing its own cargo division. In 2006, ANA, Japan Post, Nippon Express, and Mitsui O.S.K. Lines founded ANA & JP Express (AJV), which would operate freighters. ANA is the top shareholder of AJV. It absorbed Air Japan's freighter operations.

Air Transport World named ANA its 2007 "Airline of the Year". In 2006, the airline was recognized by FlightOnTime.info as the most punctual scheduled airline between London and Tokyo for the last four consecutive years, based on official British statistics. Japan Airlines took over the title in 2007. In 2009, ANA announced plans to test an idea as part of the airline's "e-flight" campaign, encouraging passengers on select flights to visit the airport restroom before they board. On 10 November of the same year, ANA also announced "Inspiration of Japan", ANA's newest international flight concept, with redesigned cabins initially launched on its 777-300ER aircraft.

In July 2011, All Nippon Airways and AirAsia agreed to form a low-cost carrier, called AirAsia Japan, based at Tokyo's Narita International Airport. ANA held 51 percent shares and AirAsia held 33 percent voting shares and 16 percent non-voting shares through its wholly owned subsidiary, AA International. The carrier lasted until October 2013, when AirAsia withdrew from the joint venture; the carrier was subsequently rebranded as Vanilla Air.

In March 2018, All Nippon Airways announced the integration of its two low cost carrier subsidiaries Peach Aviation and Vanilla Air into one entity retaining the Peach name; starting in the second half of FY2018 and to be completed by the end of FY2019.

On 29 January 2019, ANA Holdings purchased a 9.5% stake in PAL Holdings, Philippine Airlines' parent company, for US$95 million.

Parent company 
ANA Holdings Company was created in April 2013 due to the "changing landscape of the airline industry", with competition against low cost carriers cited as one of the reasons. The new holding company would have over 70 companies under it, most notably All Nippon Airways, but also low cost subsidiaries such as Peach Aviation, and other catering and ground operations companies. The holding company is led by a separate chairman and CEO.

Senior leadership 

 Chairman: Shinya Katanozaka (since April 2022) 
 Chief Executive: Koji Shibata (since April 2022)

List of former Chairmen 

 Yoji Ohashi (2013–2015)
 Shinichiro Ito (2015–2022)

List of former Chief Executives 

 Shinichiro Ito (2013–2015)
 Shinya Katanozaka (2015–2022)

Corporate affairs and identity

President and Chief Executive Officer 
All Nippon Airways has been led by only a President and CEO since April 2013, when a new parent company was formed. The Chairman of All Nippon Airways became the chairman of the holding company, and All Nippon Airways ceased to have its own chairman. The following is a list of Presidents and CEOs, along with the year of their appointment:

 Masuichi Midoro – 1952
 Kaheita Okazaki – 1961
 Isamu Morimura – 1967
 Tetsuo Oba – 1969 
 Tokuji Wakasa – 1970
 Masamichi Anzai – 1976
 Taizo Nakamura – 1983
 Akio Kondo – 1987 
 Seiji Fukatsu – 1993
 Kichisaburo Nomura – 1997
 Yoji Ohashi – 2001
 Mineo Yamamoto – 2005
 Shinichiro Ito – 2009
 Osamu Shinobe – 2013
 Yuji Hirako – 2017
 Shinichi Inoue – 2022 (current)

Headquarters

All Nippon Airways is headquartered at the Shiodome City Center in the Shiodome area in Minato, Tokyo, Japan.

In the late 1960s ANA had its headquarters in the Hikokan Building in Shinbashi, Minato. From the 1970s through the late 1990s All Nippon Airways was headquartered in the Kasumigaseki Building in Chiyoda, Tokyo. Before moving into its current headquarters, ANA had its headquarters on the grounds of Tokyo International Airport in Ōta, Tokyo. In 2002 ANA announced that it was taking up to 10 floors in the then under-construction Shiodome City Center. ANA announced that it was also moving some subsidiaries to the Shiodome City Center. Shiodome City Center, which became ANA's headquarters, opened in 2003.

Subsidiaries

ANA Group is a group of companies which are wholly or primarily owned by ANA. It comprises the following:

Commercial aviation
Air Japan
ANA Wings
Air Do (major shareholder)
Peach (largest shareholder)
Philippine Airlines (9.5% shareholder)
Vietnam Airlines (8.8% shareholder)
IFTA (Flight Training Academy training pilots for ANA Group airlines and other worldwide airlines by contract)
Pan Am International Flight Academy
General aviation
All Nippon Helicopter (dedicated for the public broadcaster NHK.)
Discontinued
AirAsia Japan (folded into Peach Aviation)
Air Hokkaido (80% shareholding, ceased operations on 31 March 2006)
Allex Cargo (merged into Air Japan)
The following airlines merged into ANA Wings on 1 October 2010
Air Nippon
Air Nippon Network
Air Next
Air Central

Cargo services

As of May 2021, ANA operates a fleet of 6 freighter aircraft, Including 4 Boeing 767-300ER(BCF) and 2 Boeing 777F.
ANA's freighters operate on 18 international routes and 6 domestic routes. ANA operates an overnight cargo hub at Naha Airport in Okinawa, which receives inbound freighter flights from key destinations in Japan, China and Southeast Asia between 1 and 4 a.m., followed by return flights between 4 and 6 a.m., allowing overnight service between these regional hubs as well as onward connections to other ANA and partner carrier flights. The 767 freighters also operate daytime flights from Narita and Kansai to various destinations in East and Southeast Asia. ANA also operates a 767 freighter on an overnight Kansai-Haneda-Saga-Kansai route on weeknights, which is used by overnight delivery services to send parcels to and from destinations in Kyushu.

ANA established a 767 freighter operation in 2006 through a JV with Japan Post, Nippon Express and Mitsui, called ANA & JP Express. ANA announced a second freighter joint venture called Allex in 2008, with Kintetsu World Express, Nippon Express, MOL Logistics and Yusen Air & Sea as JV partners. Allex merged with ANA subsidiary Overseas Courier Services (OCS), an overseas periodical distribution company, in 2009, and ANA & JP Express was folded into ANA in 2010.

ANA Cargo and the United States-based United Parcel Service have a cargo alliance and a code-share agreement, similar to an airline alliance, to transport member cargo on UPS Airlines aircraft.

ANA also has a long historical relationship with Nippon Cargo Airlines, a Narita-based operator of Boeing 747 freighters. ANA co-founded NCA with shipping company Nippon Yusen in 1978, and at one time held 27.5% of NCA's stock. ANA sold its stake to NYK in 2005, but retained a technical partnership with NCA. ANA announced in July 2013 that it would charter NCA's 747 freighter aircraft for an overnight cargo run between Narita and Okinawa, doubling capacity between ANA's key cargo hubs and freeing up 767 aircraft to operate new routes from Okinawa to Nagoya and Qingdao.

Destinations

ANA has an extensive domestic route network that covers the entirety of Japan, from Hokkaido in the north to Okinawa in the south. ANA's international route network extends through China, Korea, India, Southeast Asia, Canada, United States, Mexico, Australia, and Western Europe. Its key international hub is Narita International Airport, where it shares the South Wing of Terminal 1 with its Star Alliance partners, though Haneda Airport is becoming a major international hub due to its close proximity with downtown Tokyo and the mass expansions occurring there.

ANA's international network currently focuses on business destinations; its only remaining "resort" routes are its routes from Haneda and Narita to Honolulu; past resort routes such as Narita-Guam, Kansai-Honolulu and Nagoya-Honolulu have been cancelled, although ANA plans to expand resort service in the future through its low-cost subsidiary Peach Aviation.

Codeshare agreements
All Nippon Airways has codeshare agreements with the following airlines:

 Air Canada
 Air China
 Air Do
 Air Dolomiti
 Air Japan (Subsidiary)
 Air Macau
 Air New Zealand
 Amakusa Airlines
 Asiana Airlines
 Austrian Airlines
 Avianca
 Brussels Airlines
 Etihad Airways
 Ethiopian Airlines
 Eurowings
 EVA Air
 Garuda Indonesia
 Ibex Airlines
 Japan Air Commuter
 Juneyao Airlines
 LOT Polish Airlines
 Lufthansa
 Oriental Air Bridge
 Philippine Airlines
 Shandong Airlines
 Shenzhen Airlines
 Singapore Airlines
 Solaseed Air
 South African Airways
 StarFlyer
 Swiss International Air Lines
 TAP Air Portugal
 Thai Airways International
 Turkish Airlines
 United Airlines
 Vietnam Airlines
 Virgin Australia

Interline agreements 
All Nippon Airways have Interline agreements with the following airlines:
 Pakistan International Airlines

Fleet

Current fleet
As of February 2023, the ANA mainline fleet - excluding subsidiaries - consists of the following aircraft:

Gallery

Fleet development 
On 31 July 2014, ANA firmed up orders for 7 Airbus A320neos, 23 Airbus A321neos, 20 Boeing 777-9Xs, 14 Boeing 787-9s and 6 Boeing 777-300ERs, to be used for its short and long-haul fleet renewal. Boeing valued ANA's order at approximately $13 billion at list prices.

On 2 February 2015, ANA placed orders with Airbus and Boeing worth $2.2bn for three Boeing 787-10s, five Boeing 737-800s and seven Airbus A321s. In late July 2015, ANA entered into a secret agreement with Airbus to make additional orders in the future (number and model(s) of aircraft unidentified) in exchange for Airbus support of ANA plans to invest in bankrupt Skymark Airlines. 

Also in 2015, ANA placed orders for the since cancelled 15 Mitsubishi Regional Jets for regional flights, which were to be operated by ANA Wings.

On 29 January 2016, ANA signed a purchase agreement with Airbus, covering firm orders for three Airbus A380s, for delivery from fiscal 2018 to operate on the Tokyo (Narita) to Honolulu route.

On 11 July 2022, ANA converted 2 of its 777-9 orders into the freighter variant 777-8F.

Boeing 787
ANA was the launch customer for the new Boeing widebody, the Boeing 787 Dreamliner, ordering 50 examples with an option for 50 more during April 2004. ANA split the order between 30 of the short-range 787-3 and 20 of the long-haul 787-8. However, ANA later converted its −3 orders to the −8 variant.

Deliveries finally began in late 2011 when ANA received its first Boeing 787 on 21 September, the first-ever Dreamliner to be delivered in the world. ANA flew its first Boeing 787 passenger flight on 26 October 2011, which operated as a charter flight from Tokyo Narita to Hong Kong. ANA also became the second airline to receive the Boeing 787-9 on 28 July 2014. Despite being second, the airline preceded launch customer Air New Zealand for the first commercial flight on the 787-9, a special sightseeing charter for Japanese and American school children on 4 August.

Historic fleet

The NAMC YS-11 was an important aircraft for All Nippon Airways, although most of them were used under the name of ANK, or Air Nippon, a subsidiary of All Nippon Airways. The final YS-11 in operation was retired in 2006. A number of YS-11s are in museums, or otherwise scrapped or taken apart. After a final retirement process through September 2006, all YS-11s were grounded, obligated to retire, unless privately owned and were privately restored. The YS-11 was a big part of All Nippon Airways from the 1970s to the early 1990s, when it was used on domestic operations.

ANA flew its last flight of an Airbus A321-100 on 29 February 2008. This marked the end of almost ten years of operation of the Airbus A321-100, of which ANA was the only Japanese operator.

All Nippon Airways has operated the following aircraft:

Gallery

Liveries

Former livery 
The ANA former "Mohican" livery consists of a blue and white colour scheme painted as strip sections on the fuselage, with a blue vertical stabilizer with the former ANA logo. All aircraft wearing this livery are either retired or repainted. In 2010, one Boeing 767-300 was repainted in this livery.

In 1982, ANA officially introduced the "Triton blue" livery, which has a white and grey fuselage, with a blue strip painted under the windows, and the vertical stabilizer is painted blue with the word ANA painted sideways. In the first version, Japanese name and full English name of ANA were painted black on top of windows. After joining Star Alliance, ANA gives the livery first update, which replaced the airline's Japanese and English name to current ANA logo, this version is still using on all ANA's Boeing 777-200 aircraft.

Current livery 
Currently, ANA still uses the "Triton blue" livery, but it gives another minor update since 2010: the Japanese flag is moved near the ANA logo above the windows, and the slogan "Inspiration of Japan" is added.

Special liveries
Many ANA aircraft have operated in special liveries through the years:
 Seven jets in Star Alliance livery: two Boeing 777-200s, one Boeing 777-300ER, one Boeing 767-300ER, one Boeing 767-300, one Boeing 737-800 and one Boeing 787-9
 Ten Pokémon-themed jets: five Boeing 747-400s, four Boeing 767-300 and one Boeing 777-300
 Four Star Wars-themed jets: one Boeing 787-9 in an R2-D2 livery; one Boeing 777-300ER in a BB-8 livery; one Boeing 767-300ER in a mixed R2-D2 and BB-8 livery; and one Boeing 777-200ER in a C-3PO livery.
 Three Airbus A380-800s in ANA Flying Honu liveries ( meaning 'sea turtle' in Hawaiian)
 Three Demon Slayer: Kimetsu no Yaiba-themed jets: two Boeing 767-300ERs, one Boeing 777-200ER 
 Two Boeing 787s painted in ANA Future Promise livery to promote sustainable flying.

Services

New cabin

Introduced in 2009, the "Inspiration of Japan" cabin features included fully-lie-flat-bed business class seats, nearly enclosed first class suite seats, fixed shell back seats in both of its economy classes, a new AVOD in-flight entertainment system (based on Panasonic Avionics Corporation's eX2 IFE system with iPod connectivity, in-seat shopping and meal ordering as well as cabin touchscreen consoles) as well as improvements to its in-flight service. ANA will also introduce a new lounge (which opened on 20 February 2010, supposed to be in coincidence with the introduction of new aircraft interiors but delayed [see below]) and check-in concept (later in autumn 2010) at Narita for first class and ANA Mileage Club's Diamond Service elite members.

The introduction of the concept also discontinued the use of the name "Club ANA", which was used for its international business class seats (changing into a generic business class name) as well as the name of the lounges (all lounges for both first class and business class are named "ANA Lounge", with the first class lounge called the "ANA Suite Lounge" and its arrival lounge the "ANA Arrival Lounge").

This "Inspiration of Japan" concept was originally set to debut on 20 February 2010 with the delivery of its new Boeing 777-300ER prior to that date, followed by the introduction of the concept on that date on the Narita-New York route. However, due to delays to the new premium economy seats, the debut was pushed back to 19 April. (The delay was due to the failure of a safety test in Japan of a new seat design axle, made by seat manufacturer Koito Industries Ltd. This safety test failure also affected deliveries of aircraft to be operated by three other fellow Star Alliance members – Singapore Airlines for its A380s, Thai Airways' A330s, and Continental Airlines for new 737-800 deliveries.)

The "Inspiration of Japan" concept has been refitted on its existing 777-300ERs for service on all the airline's North American routes, and may be refitted on its European routes. Parts of it may eventually be phased into its existing Boeing 767-300ERs in service as well as the upcoming Boeing 787s in order.

Since February 2010 ANA offers women's-only lavatories on international flights. The first Boeing 787 the airline received have the bidets in both economy and business class lavatory.

Inflight magazine
ANA's inflight magazine is named Wingspan and is available both on board and as a freely downloadable application for Apple's iPad. The iPad version is named Virtual Airport and includes content from Wingspan as well as links to airline booking and online check-in pages.

Bus shuttle services
Previously ANA had a dedicated shuttle bus from Düsseldorf to Frankfurt Airport so passengers may board ANA flights at that airport, but the bus service was discontinued after ANA began its dedicated Düsseldorf flights in 2014.

In popular culture

ANA sponsored the film Happy Flight, which is about a co-pilot and flight attendant on an ANA flight to Hawaii.
ANA was featured in Miss Pilot, a Japanese television drama about a female pilot.
ANA sponsored the Japanese television drama Good Luck!!, which is about a group of airline crew members. The series starred Takuya Kimura, Shinichi Tsutsumi and Kou Shibasaki.
The title for All Nippon Air Line, a Josei manga by Kei Azumaya that was inspired by All Nippon Airways.
A few of ANA's aircraft were Pokémon themed. Special exclusive promotional cards were also given out to passengers during certain Pokémon marketing campaigns. However, as of 2014, all of the Pokémon airplanes have been retired and repainted.
The fictional airline All Korea Airlines featured in the SBS Drama Vagabond, sports similarities to ANA in regards to its name and logo.
The airplane-crash set built for War Of The Worlds; now featured in Universal Studios Hollywood's Studio Tour was one of ANA's retired Boeing 747-100SR registered as JA8147. The aircraft was dismantled into several pieces for the film and still bears the ANA livery with its titles removed.

Accidents and incidents 
In 1958, dynamite was planted in a Douglas DC-3 by Akira Emoto, a candy salesman, as part of a suicide plan. Emoto killed himself by leaping from the aircraft and the bombs failed to detonate.
On 16 March 1960, Douglas DC-3 JA5018 was taxiing after landing at Nagoya-Komaki International Airport when North American F-86D Sabre 94-8137 of the Japan Air Self-Defense Force (JASDF) collided with its aft fuselage and tail section while attempting to take off, killing 3 of 33 on board. Although the Sabre crashed and burned, the pilot survived.
On 12 June 1961, Vickers Viscount G-APKJ was written off when the starboard undercarriage collapsed following a heavy landing at Osaka Itami Airport.
On 19 November 1962, Vickers Viscount JA8202 crashed at Nagoya while on a training flight due to possible pilot error, killing all four crew on board.
On 30 April 1963, Douglas DC-3 JA5039 crashed at Hachijojima Airport due to locked up brakes; both pilots survived, but the aircraft was written off.
On 10 May 1963, DC-3 JA5040 crashed at Sendai.
On 5 June 1963, DC-3 JA5027 swerved off the runway on takeoff at Osaka-Itami Airport and struck the rear of a second DC-3 (JA5078); JA5078 was written off while JA5027 was repaired with parts from DC-3 JA5039.
On 4 February 1966, Flight 60, operated by Boeing 727 JA8302, was on approach to Tokyo Haneda Airport when it crashed into Tokyo Bay for reasons unknown, killing all 133 passengers and crew. Following this accident, all passenger aircraft operating in Japan were required to be equipped with cockpit voice recorders and flight data recorders.
On 13 November 1966, Flight 533 operated by a NAMC YS-11, crashed in the Seto Inland Sea off Matsuyama following an unexplained loss of altitude while attempting to go-around, killing all 50 on board.
On 30 July 1971, Flight 58, operated by a Boeing 727-200 (JA8329), collided with JASDF F-86F Sabre 92-7932 that was on a training flight; the right wing of the F-86 struck the left horizontal stabilizer of the 727 and both aircraft crashed out of control, killing all 162 on board the 727; the F-86 pilot ejected and survived.
On 22 June 1995 a man calling himself "Fumio Kujimi" and registered with ANA as "Saburo Kobayashi" hijacked Flight 857, a Boeing 747SR, after it took off from Tokyo. The aircraft landed in Hokkaidō where it was stormed by police, arresting the hijacker. Police stated that the hijacker was 53-year-old Fujio Kutsumi; he had demanded the release of Shoko Asahara. The hijacking incident lasted 16 hours.
On 23 July 1999, a man hijacked Flight 61 and killed the captain. He was subdued by other crew members, and no passengers or other crew were killed or injured.

On 13 March 2007,  departed Itami Airport to Kochi Airport, where the Bombardier DHC-8-402 landed without its nose landing gear, causing damage to the nose. None of the 60 passengers and crew on board were injured. The failure for the landing gear to extend was determined to be from the landing gear doors not opening due to missing parts.
On 6 September 2011, Flight 140, operated by a 737-700 traveling from Naha to Tokyo with 117 passengers and crew, banked over 90 degrees in mid-air and rapidly descended as the first officer inadvertently rotated the rudder trim switch instead of the door unlock button as the captain returned from the lavatory. The first officer eventually regained control and leveled the aircraft. There were minor injuries to two flight attendants.
On 16 January 2013, Flight 692, a Boeing 787 flying from Yamaguchi Ube Airport to Tokyo Haneda Airport reported a battery problem while climbing to FL330. The pilots made an emergency landing at Takamatsu Airport. No casualties were reported during the evacuation. However, after this incident, all 787s were subsequently grounded by aviation authorities until the battery issue was resolved.

See also

Aviation
Air transport in Japan
List of airports in Japan
List of Japanese companies
Transport in Japan
Yokohama Flügels, former football club
Oriental Land Company (0.18%)

References

External links 

All Nippon Airways website
All Nippon Airways Trading Company
ANA Net (archive)
ANA Star Wars Project
  Wiki collection of bibliographic works on All Nippon Airways

 
Airlines established in 1952
Airline companies based in Tokyo
Japanese brands
Companies listed on the Tokyo Stock Exchange
Association of Asia Pacific Airlines
Star Alliance
Japanese companies established in 1952